

The Hitachi T.2 was a trainer aircraft built in Japan in the early 1940s. It was a conventional, single-bay sesquiplane with wings braced by N-struts. The pilot and instructor sat in tandem, open cockpits, and the undercarriage was of fixed, tailskid type.

Specifications

References
 
 

1940s Japanese civil trainer aircraft
Sesquiplanes